Hyposmocoma pukoa is a species of moth of the family Cosmopterigidae. It is endemic to Maui.

The wingspan is 9–10.7 mm for males and 10.1–10.8 mm for females.

The larvae live in a larval case which has the form of a bugle-shaped structure with a light grey background colour with dark brown bands.

Etymology
The specific name is derived from the Hawaiian, pū (meaning bugle) and koa (an endemic Hawaiian tree) referring to the type of case and habitat of this species.

References

pukoa
Endemic moths of Hawaii
Moths described in 2011